Buddy Rich Plays and Plays and Plays is a big band jazz album recorded by Buddy Rich and released by RCA Records in 1977. The album also marked his last for the label. Plays and Plays and Plays was nominated for the Best Jazz Performance by a Big Band at the 20th Annual Grammy Awards in 1978, but lost to Prime Time by Count Basie.

Track listing 
LP side A:
"Ya Gotta Try" (Sammy Nestico) – 3:31
"Tales of Rhoda Rat" (Bob Mintzer) – 5:42
"'Round About Midnight" (Thelonious Monk, Cootie Williams, Bernie Hanighen) – 6:41
"Time Out" (Don Menza) – 7:53
LP side B:
"No Jive" (Bob Mintzer) – 5:55
"Lush Life" (Billy Strayhorn) – 4:05
"Party Time" (Bob Mintzer) – 5:31
"Kong" (C. Brown, E. Korvin, M. Baier, R. Punch) – 4:57
"Mickey Mouse" (Jimmie Dodd) – 2:32

Personnel
Buddy Rich – drums
Alan Gauvin – saxophone
Dean Palanzo – saxophone
Steve Marcus – tenor saxophone, soprano saxophone
Bob Mintzer – tenor saxophone, flute
Mauro Turso – saxophone
David Stahl – trumpet
Dean Pratt – trumpet
John Marshall – trumpet
Ross Konikoff – trumpet
Clinton Sharman – trombone
Rick Stepton – trombone
Dave Boyle – bass trombone
Joshua Rich – guitar
Steve Khan – guitar on "Kong"
Barry Keiner – keyboards
Jon Burr – bass
Will Lee – bass on "Kong"
Errol "Crusher" Bennett – congas on "Kong"
Gwen Guthrie – vocals (on "Kong")
Josh Brown – vocals (on "Kong")
Lani Groves – vocals (on "Kong")
K. R. Grant – vocals (on "Mickey Mouse")

References 

RCA CPL1-2273 (1977 LP)
BMG 37435 (2005 CD)
Wounded Bird Records 2273 (2008 CD)
BGO (Beat Goes On) Records (2010 '2-fer' re-issue / compilation together with Speak No Evil)
...Plays and Plays and Plays at discogs.com

1977 albums
Buddy Rich albums
RCA Records albums